North District Park is a public park situated between Sheung Shui and Fanling in North District, Hong Kong. It opened on 10 March 1990. It is one of the largest parks in Hong Kong. Sheung Shui Centre and Sheung Shui Town Centre are located near its northern side, and adjacent to its southeastern border is the village Fanling Wai.

See also
 List of urban public parks and gardens in Hong Kong

External links

 Information on the Park

Urban public parks and gardens in Hong Kong
North District, Hong Kong